George Morris (born 29 August 1957) is a New Zealand former cricket umpire. He stood in four Test matches between 1985 and 1987 and eight ODI games between 1984 and 1988.

See also
 List of Test cricket umpires
 List of One Day International cricket umpires

References

1957 births
Living people
Sportspeople from Dunedin
New Zealand Test cricket umpires
New Zealand One Day International cricket umpires